The Samsun–Kalın railway is a  long railway in the Black Sea Region of Turkey. It connects to the Ankara–Kars railway, near Sivas from the port city of Samsun, running through the Pontic mountains. It is one of two railways that service a Black Sea port, along with the Irmak–Zonguldak railway.

The Amasya–Kalın section is closed for renovation.

References

Railway lines in Turkey
1932 establishments in Turkey
Railway lines opened in 1932
Transport in Samsun Province
Transport in Sivas Province